Raymond Joseph "Rockabye Ray" Gariepy (September 4, 1928 – March 16, 2012) was a Canadian professional ice hockey hard hitting defenceman, who 36 games in the National Hockey League between 1953 and 1956 for the Boston Bruins and Toronto Maple Leafs.

Playing career
He was raised from an early age in Timmins Ontario, where he first put skate to ice at the age of 14. He was scouted by Hap Emms of the Barrie Flyers, of the OHA Jr. A (from 1945 to 1948), of which Ray was Captain for all 3 years. After Jr. A., Ray played with the Buffalo Bisons AHL, Houston Huskies & Louisville Blades USHL,(1948–49) and Hershey Bears (1950–53) of the AHL. In 1954–55 Ray played for the Pittsburgh Hornets that won the AHL Championship's top prize; The Calder Cup. He finished his professional career with the Toronto Maple Leafs of the National Hockey League in the 1955–56 season after playing one game.

Gariepy's lone NHL goal occurred on January 21, 1954 in Boston's 3-2 win over the Blackhawks at Chicago Stadium. 

In September 1956, Gariepy retired from the professional ranks. Now in possession of his amateur card, he played in the Canadian Senior ice hockey league, as well as other senior amateur ice hockey leagues in central Ontario in the coming years. Starting out in 1956–57, he played with the Owen Sound Mercurys of the Canadian Senior ice hockey league. In the remaining years, Ray played as either a player, a player/coach, or coach, until his final season in the 1970–71 campaign as coach of the OHA Sr. A Barrie Flyers. He was selected as an All-Star in both of his 1961 and 1966 seasons.  All in all, from his Junior A. hockey days with the Barrie Flyers in 1945, to his final season coaching the OHA Senior A Barrie Flyers in 1971, it was an impressive 25-year career in professional and amateur ice hockey. He returned for a season in 1975 to coach the Barrie Juvenile Co-op Midgets of the Barrie Minor Hockey Association BMHA. He was inducted into the Barrie Sports Hall of Fame in 2009.

Career statistics

Regular season and playoffs

References

External links

1928 births
2012 deaths
Barrie Flyers players
Boston Bruins players
Buffalo Bisons (AHL) players
Canadian ice hockey defencemen
Hershey Bears players
Houston Huskies players
Louisville Blades players
Ontario Hockey Association Senior A League (1890–1979) players
Pittsburgh Hornets players
Ice hockey people from Toronto
Toronto Maple Leafs players